Toivo Ndjebela is a Namibian journalist and the editor-in-chief of the Namibian Sun daily. He also worked as managing editor of the state-owned New Era newspaper.

Ndjebela holds a bachelor's degree in media studies from the University of Namibia (2006) and a master's degree in foreign reporting from the University of Helsinki (2007). He has worked as a deputy news editor at the state-owned newspaper New Era, reporter at the tabloid newspaper Informanté, and as senior journalist at the Windhoek Observer. He was appointed as the editor of the Namibian Sun in May 2012. Ndjebela returned to New Era in 2014, and again to the Namibian Sun, as editor-in-chief, in 2019. In 2021, he along with veteran journalist and editor Gwen Lister, was acknowledged as champion of world press freedom.

References 

Living people
People from Windhoek
Ovambo people
Namibian newspaper editors
Namibian newspaper journalists
University of Namibia alumni
University of Helsinki alumni
Year of birth missing (living people)